Dhrubajyoti Phukan is a National Film Award winning musician who has worked as a Music Producer, Music Arranger and Music Programmer in Hindi Films. Widely known as DJ Phukan, he has also worked as a music director for several films.

Composing career

In 2012, Phukan won the 59th National Film Awards as the best Music Director for his music in the Hindi short film Panchakki. It capped an intermittent but creatively fecund career as a music director which began with the Raveena Tandon  production Stumped  in 2003. Recently, he also composed for renowned director Jahnu Barua's films Baandhon and Ajeyo, both of which bagged the National Film Award for Best Feature Film in Assamese.

Personal life

Dhrubajyoti Phukan married singer Shaswati Phukan in 1991, and is the father of a daughter, Shreya Phukan, and a son, Ayushjyoti Phukan.

Selective discography as music arranger

Filmography

As background music composer

As music director

Honours

Awards

References

External links
 
 

Music directors
Living people
1964 births